The 2014–15 season is the 8th season in the Football League played by Dagenham & Redbridge F.C., an English football club based in Dagenham, Greater London. It is their fourth consecutive season in Football League Two after relegation from Football League One in 2011.

Competitions

Football League Two

League table

Matches

FA Cup

Football League Cup

Football League Trophy

Appearances and goals
Source:
Numbers in parentheses denote appearances as substitute.
Players with names struck through and marked  left the club during the playing season.
Players with names in italics and marked * were on loan from another club with Dagenham & Redbridge.
Players listed with no appearances have been in the matchday squad but only as unused substitutes.
Key to positions: GK – Goalkeeper; DF – Defender; MF – Midfielder; FW – Forward

Transfers

In

Out

Loans in

Loans out

References

2014-15
Dag